100 dage is a song by Danish rock singer Thomas Helmig from his sixteenth studio album Tommy Boy, featuring vocals from Danish pop singer Medina. It was released  on 18 September 2009. "100 dage" peaked at number one in Denmark.

Track listing
 Danish digital download
 "100 Dage" – 4:16

Charts

Release history

References

2009 singles
Medina (singer) songs
2009 songs
Sony Music singles